Get the Message is a compilation album by the Johnny Marr/Bernard Sumner band Electronic, released in September 2006 (see 2006 in music). It is the first career-spanning collection of the band; a 1999 Japanese compilation was cancelled just before release.

Content
The album includes every A-side, two B-sides ("Imitation of Life" and "All That I Need") and four album tracks ("Out of My League", "Like No Other", "Prodigal Son" and "Twisted Tenderness"). It was compiled by Craig DeGraff and Electronic. New liner notes written by the band are also included.

A limited edition of the album includes a bonus DVD of all the band's music videos, except for "Late at Night" and the European version of "Getting Away with It" (the American film is featured).

Track listing
All tracks written by Bernard Sumner and Johnny Marr, except where noted.

CD
 "Forbidden City" (Sumner, Marr, Karl Bartos) 1996 
 "Getting Away with It" (Sumner, Marr, Neil Tennant) 1989
 "Get the Message"  1991 
 "Feel Every Beat"  1991 
 "Disappointed" (Sumner, Marr, Tennant)  1992
 "Vivid"  1999
 "Second Nature"  1997 
 "All That I Need" 1996 
 "Prodigal Son" 1999
 "For You" (Sumner, Marr, Karl Bartos)  1996 
 "Imitation of Life" (Sumner, Marr, Karl Bartos)  1996 
 "Out of My League"  1996
 "Like No Other"  1999 
 "Twisted Tenderness"  1999 
 "Late at Night"  1999

DVD (Limited Edition - PAL)
 "Getting Away with It" (Sumner, Marr, Tennant)
 "Get the Message"
 "Feel Every Beat"
 "Disappointed" (Sumner, Marr, Tennant)
 "Forbidden City"
 "For You"
 "Vivid"

References

External links
 feel every beat (unofficial website)
 worldinmotion.net (unofficial website)
 New Order Online (unofficial New Order and Electronic website)

2006 greatest hits albums
Electronic (band) albums
2006 video albums
Albums produced by Arthur Baker (musician)
Music video compilation albums
Rhino Records compilation albums
Rhino Records video albums